untitled (landscape) is an 1883-1911 drawing by Swedish artist Carl Fredrik Hill. The drawing is in the collection of the Malmö Art Museum in Sweden.

1910s drawings